A number of motor vessels have been named Claymore, including

, a passenger-cargo ship, supplying Pitcairn Island from New Zealand and French Polynesia
, David MacBrayne's last mailboat, serving the Inner Isles between 1955 and 1972
, a Clyde car and passenger ferry between 1978 and 1997 for Caledonian MacBrayne
, a possible name for Hull 802, a dual fuel ferry under construction for the Uig Triangle for Caledonian MacBrayne

Ship names